The Theban Tomb TT30 is located in Sheikh Abd el-Qurna, part of the Theban Necropolis, on the west bank of the Nile, opposite to Luxor. It is the burial place of the ancient Egyptian official, Khonsumose.

Khonsumose was a scribe of the treasury of the estate of Amun during the Ramesside Period. His wife Henutenkhunet is mentioned in the tomb.

See also
 List of Theban tombs

References

Buildings and structures completed in the 13th century BC
Theban tombs